Bryotropha parapurpurella is a moth of the family Gelechiidae. It is found in Russia (Siberia: Transbaikalia).

References

Moths described in 1998
parapurpurella
Moths of Asia